Dietmar Koszewski (born 26 July 1967 in Berlin) is a retired German hurdler.

He won a bronze medal for West Germany at the 1990 European Championships in Athletics in Split and the gold medal at the 1993 Summer Universiade in Buffalo.

His personal best was 13.41 seconds, achieved in July 1990 in Hamburg. This ranks him ninth among German 110 m hurdlers, behind Florian Schwarthoff, Mike Fenner, Eric Kaiser, Falk Balzer, Thomas Blaschek, Sven Göhler, Thomas Munkelt and Holger Pohland.

References

1967 births
Living people
German male hurdlers
Athletes (track and field) at the 1992 Summer Olympics
Olympic athletes of Germany
European Athletics Championships medalists
Universiade medalists in athletics (track and field)
Universiade gold medalists for Germany
Medalists at the 1993 Summer Universiade